Trisector is the tenth studio album by the British rock group Van der Graaf Generator. It was released on Virgin/EMI Records in March 2008. It is the first album the band has recorded as a trio. Saxophonist David Jackson departed the band following the 2005 tour.

Track listing 

All songs by Hugh Banton, Guy Evans and Peter Hammill except where noted.

"The Hurlyburly" (instrumental) – 4:38
"Interference Patterns" – 3:52
"The Final Reel" – 5:49
"Lifetime" (Hammill) – 4:47
"Drop Dead" – 4:53
"Only in a Whisper" – 6:44
"All That Before" – 6:29
"Over the Hill" – 12:29
"(We Are) Not Here" – 4:04

Personnel 
Van der Graaf Generator 
 Peter Hammill – voice, piano, electric guitar
 Hugh Banton – organs (including bass pedals), bass guitar
 Guy Evans – drums, percussion

References

External links 
 
 
 Van der Graaf Generator – Trisector (2008) album review by François Couture, credits & releases at AllMusic.com
 Van der Graaf Generator – Trisector (2008) album releases & credits at Discogs.com
 Van der Graaf Generator – Trisector (2008) album credits & user reviews at ProgArchives.com
 Van der Graaf Generator – Trisector (2008) album to be listened as stream at Spotify.com

Van der Graaf Generator albums
2008 albums
Virgin Records albums